Amanda Sainsbury-Salis (born 1969) is an Australian medical researcher, educator and author. Her research interests are hypothalamic control of body weight, famine reaction, metabolism, body composition, anorexia, obesity, eating disorders.

Background and early career
Born Amanda Sainsbury in Sydney, New South Wales in 1969, Sainsbury-Salis grew up in Perth, Western Australia. She graduated from the University of Western Australia in 1990. She was the Australian recipient of the Boursière de la Confédération (Swiss Government Scholarship) in 1991 and she received her PhD from the University of Geneva, Switzerland in 1996.

Scientific career
Sainsbury-Salis returned to Australia in 1998 to work at the Garvan Institute of Medical Research where she currently leads a research team. She is also a senior lecturer in the University of New South Wales Faculty of Medicine.

Published works

References

External links
Dr Amanda Online 
Dr Amanda Sainsbury-Salis profile in Garvan Institute of Medical Research
Interview with Dr. Amanda on Mornings with Margaret Throsby at ABC Classic FM

1969 births
Australian non-fiction writers
Australian women scientists
Australian medical researchers
Living people
Scientists from Sydney
University of Western Australia alumni
People educated at John XXIII College, Perth
Garvan Institute of Medical Research alumni